Earl Walter Hersh (May 21, 1932 – March 18, 2013), was an American professional baseball outfielder, who played seven games in Major League Baseball (MLB), for the Milwaukee Braves, during the  season. He was originally signed by the Braves, as an amateur free agent, prior to the  season. Hersh also played in the Puerto Rico Baseball League.

Hersh graduated from West Chester Teachers College in 1953. He was inducted into that institution's Athletic Hall of Fame. A two-sport athlete, Hersh was recognized separately, in both football (1982), and baseball (1992). An end, he was also drafted by the National Football League (NFL) Philadelphia Eagles, in the 27th round of the 1953 NFL Draft, but elected to play baseball, professionally.

In , Hersh won the American Association RBI title, while playing for the Wichita Braves. On May 28, 1959, he was traded to the Detroit Tigers as part of a four-player deal, but was returned to the Braves system when another player involved in the trade refused to report to his new team.

A curious fact is that all three of Hersh's big league hits were doubles, which ties him with Verdo Elmore  and Dennis Powell for the most hits in an MLB career, where all of the player's hits were two-baggers.

Hersh was born in Ebbvale, Maryland. He spent most of his adult life in the field of education, serving as an educator, administrator, and coach, retiring in 1992. Hersh died in Hanover, Pennsylvania, on March 18, 2013.

References

External links

Earl Hersh at Pura Pelota (Venezuelan Professional Baseball League)

Earl Hersh at Legacy.com

1932 births
2013 deaths
Atlanta Crackers players
Baseball players from Maryland
Charleston Senators players
Chattanooga Lookouts players
Evansville Braves players
Hagerstown Braves players
Leones del Caracas players
American expatriate baseball players in Venezuela
Louisville Colonels (minor league) players
Major League Baseball left fielders
Milwaukee Braves players
People from Carroll County, Maryland
Toledo Sox players
Toronto Maple Leafs (International League) players
West Chester Golden Rams baseball players
West Chester Golden Rams football players
Wichita Braves players